Le Bataillon du ciel (Sky Battalion) is a 1947 French film in two parts by Alexander Esway about the Second World War. The film, written by Joseph Kessel, became the biggest box office success in France that year with more than 8 million tickets sold. The first part, Ce ne sont pas des anges (They are no Angels) was released on 8 March 1947, the second part Terre de France (The land of France) one month later. The total length is 3 hours and 20 minutes. It tells the story of French parachute troops who train in Free France and then land in Brittany the day before the Normandy landings to fight against the Germans.

Despite being one of the few films to deal with the resistance against the German occupation from within Free France (the most important other one being Taxi for Tobruk), it was cited a lot less in studies of French films dealing with the Second World War than films about either the resistance within occupied France, or the efforts by the Allies.

Cast
Raymond Bussières
Howard Vernon
Pierre Blanchar
René Lefèvre
Janine Crispin
Marcel Mouloudji

Notes

Further reading

External links

1940s French-language films
1947 films 
Films directed by Alexander Esway
French black-and-white films
French World War II films